Linfield have won the Women's Premiership four times from 2016 to 2019. They played in the UEFA Women's Champions League qualifying stage four times.

Linfield have also won the national cup, the IFA Women's Challenge Cup in 2013, 2014 and 2016.

As of 2023, Linfield Ladies rebranded themselves as Linfield Football Club Women and will officially refer to their team as "Linfield". The club put out a statement; “Whilst the governing body and regional association require a method to demarcate our teams, we see it as an important step to remove the gender assignation. The players are Linfield players, regardless of gender. Therefore, our team playing in the NIFL Women’s Premiership will be referred to as Linfield”.

In a further step, the club responded to concerns of their players around the traditional use of white coloured shorts and the menstrual cycle. Similar to the example set by Manchester City, the club acknowledged how this can affect players. Linfield will now wear darker coloured shorts.

Players

First team Squad

Former players

Titles
 Women's Premiership (4): 2016, 2017, 2018, 2019 
 IFA Women's Challenge Cup (3): 2013, 2014, 2016,

References

External links

Facebook page

Ladies
Women's association football clubs in Northern Ireland
Women's Premiership (Northern Ireland) teams
Association football clubs in Belfast